Mirvac is an Australian property group with operations across property investment, development, and retail services. This entity now broadens their clientele and shareholder return on investment by venturing across multiple development sectors, including residential and offering build to rent developments. Mirvac is also listed on the Australian Stock Exchange ("ASX").

Founding and History
Mirvac was founded in 1972. According to its website, the business association that was to become Mirvac began developing residential property during the early 1970s.

The company has built a track record for creating high quality luxury residential properties across Australia. Key projects include Walsh Bay, Harold Park, The Melburnian, and Pier in Newstead, QLD. Mirvac's award-winning Design and Construction teams, deliver end-to-end capability, which has garnered hundreds of awards, raised the bar in terms of design, sustainability, and introduced a host of innovative new techniques and technologies into the market.

Within the Commercial division, Mirvac owns and manages investment-grade properties valued at more than $7.8 billion. The portfolio includes commercial offices, retail centres and industrial properties across Australia. Assets include the award-winning 8 Chifley Office Tower and Broadway Shopping Centre, both in Sydney. Tenants include major organisations, leading Australian and international companies, and the government.

References

External links
 

Real estate companies of Australia
Companies based in Sydney
Property management companies
Companies listed on the Australian Securities Exchange